Shinjin H-SJ Micro Bus was introduced in 1962 as part of growing company at Shinjin Industrial Company.

Description 

This is 25 seat yellow micro bus that started Shinjin's bus industry.  The chassis, engine, powertrain and wheels are from old military surplus that they used to assembled.  They had old steel drum scrap was shaped into the body as the early production started.  In 1965, at the Seoul area they have both blue and cyan horizontal stripes paint scheme which it identified as carpooling that falls into this class.  In January 1966, the company name changed to Shinjin Automobile Industry Co., Ltd after they acquired Saenara Motors as the bus production and marquee remains.

See also 
Shinjin Motor (1955~1971)
Shinjin Motors
GM Daewoo

References 

 기업연혁: 신진자동차 (Beginning of the production year)
 연혁: 1970년대 이전 (Marquee pictures as shown)

External links 

 뚝심으로 이룬 - 신진 자동차제국
 전자사보: 2003.여름호; 대우버스그50년의 역사
 대우 자동차, 이름, 뜻,종류 (End of the production year)
 서울시내버스 도색역사 (First two sections)
 DAEWOO BUS (H-SJ MICRO BUS)

Defunct bus manufacturers
Bus manufacturers of South Korea
Minibuses